Dennis L Hartmann is an American atmospheric scientist at the University of Washington.  He has done research on ozone depletion and climate change.

In 2016 he was elected to the National Academy of Sciences.
He is a Revelle Medal committee member.

References

External links
 

American atmospheric scientists
University of Washington faculty
Members of the United States National Academy of Sciences
Year of birth missing (living people)
Living people